Saint Nicholas Peak is a  mountain summit in the Rocky Mountains of Canada. It is located on the Continental Divide, on the Alberta-British Columbia border, in both Banff National Park and Yoho National Park. It lies at the eastern edge of the Wapta Icefield, and is part of the Waputik Mountains which are a sub-range of the Canadian Rockies.

Name
It was named in 1916 by Arthur O. Wheeler; a particular gendarme on the mountain is said to resemble Santa Claus.

Geology
The peak is composed of sedimentary rock laid down during the Precambrian to Jurassic periods. Formed in shallow seas, this sedimentary rock was pushed east and over the top of younger rock during the Laramide orogeny.

Climate
Based on the Köppen climate classification, it is located in a subarctic climate zone with cold, snowy winters, and mild summers. Temperatures can drop below -20 C with wind chill factors below -30 C.

Gallery

See also

Geography of British Columbia
List of peaks on the British Columbia–Alberta border

References

Further reading 
 Dave Birrell, 50 Roadside Panoramas in the Canadian Rockies, P 51

External links
Parks Canada web site: Banff National Park
Parks Canada web site: Yoho National Park
Saint Nicholas Peak weather: Mountain Forecast
Saint Nicholas Peak photo (with Mt. Olive in the back left): Flickr

Two-thousanders of Alberta
Three-thousanders of Alberta
Two-thousanders of British Columbia
Three-thousanders of British Columbia
Canadian Rockies
Mountains of Yoho National Park
Mountains of Banff National Park